The following is a list of squads for each nation competing in 2019 EAFF E-1 Football Championship Final in Busan, South Korea. Each nation must submit a squad of 23 players, including 3 goalkeepers.

Age, caps and goals as of the start of the tournament, 10 December 2019.

China
Head coach: Li Tie

Source:

Hong Kong
Head coach:  Mixu Paatelainen

Source:

Japan
Head coach: Hajime Moriyasu

Source:

South Korea
Head coach:  Paulo Bento

Source:

References

EAFF E-1 Football Championship squads